Frank Audley Henry Boynton (1 January 1887 – 3 March 1946) was an Australian rules footballer who played with Melbourne, Geelong and University in the Victorian Football League (VFL).

Boynton was born in Prahran, Victoria, the eldest child of Thomas Henry Boynton and Agnes Amelia Dawes. The family lived in Balranald where Boynton and Dawes was a major grocery shop. He was educated at Wesley College, Melbourne, where he was a prefect and champion athlete, cricketer, footballer and rower. He was a notable athlete while studying medicine at the University of Melbourne, being awarded four sporting blues and playing VFL football for five seasons. After one game with Melbourne in 1906, he played most games in Geelong's 1907 season. He then played intermittently for University during their first three seasons in the VFL.

Boynton left Melbourne to continue to study medicine in Adelaide but did not finish the course. He later moved to Perth where he sold farm machinery. In 1925 he married Mary Elizabeth Smith and they lived in Northam, Western Australia until his death in 1946.

References

External links

DemonWiki profile

1887 births
1946 deaths
Australian rules footballers from New South Wales
Melbourne Football Club players
Geelong Football Club players
University Football Club players
People educated at Wesley College (Victoria)
University of Melbourne alumni sportspeople
Australian rules footballers from Melbourne